Ellinor Franzén Almlöv, (born 11 April 1978) is a Swedish singer that has participated twice in Melodifestivalen first in 1996 with the song Finns här för dig, and then in 2001 with the song Om du stannar här. She has also been the leadsinger of the music group Fjeld.  she works as a social secretary in Skövde.

References

Living people
1978 births
20th-century Swedish women singers
21st-century Swedish women singers
Melodifestivalen contestants of 2001
Melodifestivalen contestants of 1996